Boccia has been contested at the Summer Paralympics since the 1984 Games in New York City and Stoke Mandeville. Five boccia events were held at those games, two for men, two for women, and one mixed event where men and women competed together. Since then, all boccia events at the Paralympics have been mixed. Athletes in this sport have cerebral palsy and are given a classification according to the extent of their disability. There were originally two classes, C1 and C2, with C1 corresponding to those with more severe impairment. In 1996 a "C1 with aid device" class was added, and in 2000 the system was changed to have four classes, BC1 through BC4.

Summary

Events 
The table below gives the total number of boccia events and the disability classifications contested in individual, pairs, and team competition for each edition of the Summer Paralympics. All events were mixed unless noted otherwise.

Medal table 
Updated after the 2020 Summer Paralympics

Multi medalists
Boccia players who have won two gold medals or five medals. Active players are in bold.

Nations

References 

 

 

 
Boccia competitions
Paralympics
Sports at the Summer Paralympics